Millard "Andy" Anderson was an American football, basketball, and baseball player, coach, and college athletics administrator.  He served as the athletic director and head football, basketball, and baseball coach at Valparaiso University during the 1925–26 academic year.  Anderson graduated from Valparaiso in 1924.  He played football, basketball, and baseball as a student-athlete.  Anderson coached at Key West High School from 1926 to 1929.  Thereafter he worked as a civil engineer until 1970.

Head coaching record

Football

References

Year of birth missing
Year of death missing
American football ends
American men's basketball players
Baseball catchers
Centers (basketball)
Valparaiso Beacons athletic directors
Valparaiso Beacons baseball coaches
Valparaiso Beacons baseball players
Valparaiso Beacons football coaches
Valparaiso Beacons football players
Valparaiso Beacons men's basketball coaches
Valparaiso Beacons men's basketball players
People from Ramsey County, Minnesota
Players of American football from Minnesota
Baseball players from Minnesota
Basketball coaches from Minnesota
Basketball players from Minnesota